TVS Supply Chain Solutions (TVS SCS) is an Indian multinational transportation, logistics and warehousing company. It provides supply chain management services to customers in the automotive, consumer goods, defence and utility sectors in India, the United Kingdom, Europe and the US. It is part of the TVS Group of companies.

TVS's major UK customers include Isuzu, Daimler Trucks and Dennis Eagle in the automotive sector; the Ministry of Defence in the defence sector; and Network Rail, Electricity North West and United Utilities in the utility sector.

History 

The company began as TVS Logistics a division of TVS & Sons in 1995 before being hived off as a separate company in 2004 as TVS Logistics Services Ltd. (TVS LSL). In 2004 it bought out the UK based CJ Components – an automotive component sourcing company. The company pursued further acquisitions across Europe, the UK, the USA, Singapore and Australia.

In 2009, TVS LSL acquired Multipart Holding, which is among the top three after market logistics companies in UK. With the Multipart acquisition, TVS LSL formed a European subsidiary, TVS Supply Chain Solutions (TVS SCS) from JC and Multipart. Rico operated as a subsidiary of TVS SCS and was renamed TVS SCS Rico in  2017.

TVS Logistics was then renamed to TVS Supply Chain Solutions in 2019.

In 2020, Mitsubishi Corp invested in TVS Supply Chain Solutions for minority stake.

References 

Indian companies established in 1995
TVS Group